Aalborg RK is a Danish rugby club in Aalborg.

History
The club was founded in 1964.

Players

Current squad

External links
 Aalborg RK

Rugby clubs established in 1964
Danish rugby union teams
Sport in Aalborg
1964 establishments in Denmark